Cunningham is a surname of Scottish origin, see Clan Cunningham.

Notable people sharing this surname

A–C
Aaron Cunningham (born 1986), American baseball player
Abe Cunningham, American drummer
Adrian Cunningham (born 1960), Australian archivist
Alan Cunningham, British Second World War general
Alexander Cunningham (1814–1893), British archaeologist, father of the Archaeological Survey of India
Alexander Cunningham, 1st Earl of Glencairn (1426–1488), a Scottish nobleman
Alexander Cunningham, 5th Earl of Glencairn (died 1574), a Scottish nobleman and covenanter
Alfred Austell Cunningham, American aviation pioneer
Allan Cunningham (disambiguation) or Allen Cunningham, several people
Andrew Cunningham, 1st Viscount Cunningham of Hyndhope, British Second World War admiral
Andrew Cunningham (disambiguation) or Andy Cunningham, several people
Archibald Cunningham (1879–1915), Scottish footballer
Bert Cunningham (1865–1962), American baseball player
Bertram Cunningham, British Anglican priest and academic
Bill Cunningham (disambiguation), several people
Bill Cunningham (talk show host), American radio talk show host
Billy Cunningham, American basketball player and coach
Birgit Cunningham, Anglo-American activist 
Bob Cunningham (disambiguation), several people
Briggs Cunningham, American racing driver and team owner, sports car designer and manufacturer
Brysson Cunningham, Scottish harbour engineer and author on dock and harbour engineering and operation
Cade Cunningham (born 2001), American basketball player
Cal Cunningham (born 1973), Democratic state senator in North Carolina
Charles Cunningham (disambiguation), several people, including:
Charles Cunningham, Royal Navy admiral
Charles Milton Cunningham, American newspaper editor and politician
Chris Cunningham, British director and video artist
 Christian Cunningham (born 1997), American basketball player in the Israeli Basketball Premier League
Clare Cunningham (athlete), British athlete 
Claire Cunningham, British choreographer 
Colin Cunningham (swimmer), British swimmer

D–J

Daniel John Cunningham, Scottish anatomist
Darryl Cunningham, English cartoonist
Darren J. Cunningham, known professionally as Actress, British electronic music producer
David Cunningham (disambiguation), several people
David Loren Cunningham, film producer
Dominick Cunningham (born 1995), British artistic gymnast
Ebenezer Cunningham, British mathematician
Edward Francis Cunningham, Scottish painter
Edwin Cunningham (disambiguation), several people
Elaine Cunningham, American fantasy and science-fiction author
Elmer T. Cunningham, American entrepreneur and businessman, specializing in vacuum tubes and radio manufacturing
E. V. Cunningham, pseudonym of Howard Fast, an American writer
Francine Cunningham, Indigenous writer, artist, and educator
Francis Cunningham (painter)
Gary Cunningham (born 1940/1941), American basketball coach and athletic director
Glenn Cunningham (disambiguation), several people
Gordon Cunningham (golfer), Scottish golfer
Graeme Cunningham (cricketer), Australian cricketer
Graeme Cunningham (Scottish footballer), Scottish footballer
Harry Cunningham (disambiguation), several people 
Hugh Cunningham (disambiguation), several people
Imogen Cunningham (1883–1976), American photographer
J. V. Cunningham, American poet
Jack Cunningham (disambiguation), several people
James Cunningham (disambiguation), several people
Jason D. Cunningham, US Air Force pararescue medic
Jason Cunningham, English boxer
Jean Wooden Cunningham, American politician and lawyer
Jeff Cunningham, American association football player
Jim Cunningham (disambiguation), several people
John Cunningham (disambiguation) or Johnny Cunningham, several people
Joseph Cunningham (disambiguation) or Joe Cunningham, several people

K–Z

Keiron Cunningham, British rugby league player
Kenny Cunningham, Irish footballer
Korey Cunningham, American football player
Kristan Cunningham, American interior designer and television personality
Larry Cunningham (1938–2012), Irish country music singer
Larry Cunningham (1951–2019), American R&B singer, member of the vocal group The Floaters
Laurie Cunningham, English former footballer
Leland Cunningham, American astronomer and electronic computing authority
Liam Cunningham, an Irish actor
Loren Cunningham, American-born missions statesman and founder of Youth With A Mission
Malik Cunningham (born 1998), American football player
Marta Cunningham (1869–1937), American-born European-based soprano-singer and philanthropist
Mary Ann Cunningham (1841-1930), Canadian temperance activist
Melvin Cunningham (born 1973), American football player
Merce Cunningham (1919–2009), American choreographer
Michael Cunningham, American novelist, author of The Hours
Michael R. Cunningham, Chancellor National University System
Milton Joseph Cunningham, American politician
Minnie Fisher Cunningham, American suffrage politician
Myrna Cunningham, Miskita feminist and indigenous rights activist from Nicaragua
Owen Cunningham, Australian rugby league footballer
Patrick Cunningham (politician) (1878–1960), Irish politician
Paul Cunningham (disambiguation), several people
Phil Cunningham (folk musician), Scottish accordionist with the folk group Silly Wizard
Phil Cunningham (rock musician), English musician
Randall Duke Cunningham, U.S. Representative from California
Randall Cunningham, American football player
Redmond Cunningham, Irish officer in the British Army
Richie Cunningham (American football) (born 1970), American football placekicker
Robert Cunningham (disambiguation), any of several people
Ross Cunningham, Scottish footballer
Samuel Cunningham (born 1989), Thai footballer
Scott Cunningham, writer
Sean S. Cunningham, film producer and director
Sederrik Cunningham, American football player
Sophie Cunningham (writer) (born 1963), Australian writer and editor
Sophie Cunningham (basketball) (born 1996), American basketball player
Stacey Cunningham, 67th President of the New York Stock Exchange
Sumner Archibald Cunningham (1843–1913), American Confederate veteran and newspaper editor
Tony Cunningham (footballer), Jamaican former footballer
Timothy J. Cunningham (1982–2018), American epidemiologist
Walter Cunningham (1932-2023), American astronaut, Apollo 7 crew member
Walterina Cunningham (died 1837), Scottish author and poet
Wade Cunningham, New Zealand racing driver
Ward Cunningham, American computer programmer, developer of the first wiki
William Cunningham (disambiguation), several people
Zach Cunningham (born 1994), American football player

Notable fictional characters sharing this surname
 Max Cunningham, character from Hollyoaks
 Tom Cunningham, also a character from Hollyoaks
 The Cunningham family from Happy Days:
 Howard Cunningham, father
 Marion Cunningham, mother
 Richie Cunningham, second son and also the series' original lead character
 Joanie Cunningham, younger daughter
 The Cunningham family in To Kill a Mockingbird by Harper Lee
 Mr and Alec Cunningham in the Sherlock Holmes story "The Adventure of the Reigate Squire"

Other uses of the Cunningham name
 Cunningham automobile
 Cunningham-Hall Aircraft Corporation (1928–1948), aircraft manufacturer in Rochester, New York
 James Cunningham, Son and Company (1882–1936), carriage and auto company in Rochester, New York

Scottish toponymic surnames
Surnames of Lowland Scottish origin
English-language surnames